Wide Angle is the debut studio album by Welsh breakbeat group Hybrid. It was released to critical acclaim, described by The Times as "one of the most moving pieces of electronic music ever". The album was re-released in 2000 as a double-CD edition entitled Wider Angle.

Background
The core Hybrid duo of Mike Truman and Chris Healings cooperated with Lee Mullin to create the dance music backbone of the album, with a mix of progressive breakbeat, techno, trance and house.  However, they were joined by a wide array of musical personnel for this expansive, symphonic album.  Orchestral parts were performed by the Russian Federal Orchestra, conducted by Sacha Puttnam, who was also responsible for the orchestral arrangements.  Julee Cruise, best known for the theme of Twin Peaks, supplied vocals on several songs, and Soon E MC added French rapping to "Sinequanon".

In 2000, the album was re-released as a double CD package, labelled Wider Angle.  The second CD, titled Live Angle, featured a live set with Alex Madge on drums and Jamie Griffiths on turntables, and several singles, including "Kid 2000" with Chrissie Hynde.

Track listing

UK version

US version
The US version had 13 tracks and the tracks were mixed differently.

Usage in other media
"Finished Symphony" was featured in the video games SSX and SSX Tricky.
"Finished Symphony" is also featured in one episode of Top Gear, though the version featured is both shorter and different. It was later released in Top Gear: the Ultimate Driving Experience. It's also featured on the "Finished Symphony" single as "Finished Symphony (Soundtrack Edit)".
"Finished Symphony" is featured on the video game Juiced.
"Finished Symphony" is really a remix of "Symphony", an old track produced by Hybrid before Wide Angle.
"Sinequanon" has been remixed and featured in the movie Catacombs.
"Accelerator", "Burnin'", "Snyper", and "Theme From Wide Angle" are featured in the PC version of the video game Lotus Challenge.
"Kill City" was used in a Dennis Kucinich ad.
Saab Automobile used a modified orchestral version of "If I Survive" in their 2008 Saab 9-3 TTID commercial.
"If I Survive" is prominently featured as the theme song for the PlayStation 2 2001 futuristic racing game, Kinetica.
A remix of "I Know" was used in the CSI: New York episode "Heroes".

Charts

References

1999 debut albums
Hybrid (British band) albums
Distinct'ive Records albums